The Columbia Area Career Center is a vocational school in Columbia, Missouri operated by Columbia Public Schools providing career and technical education. Students are mainly from Columbia's four public high schools: Hickman High School, Douglass High School, Rock Bridge High School, and Battle High School. The Career Center also serves students from Columbia Independent School, Christian Fellowship School, Heritage Academy, Tolton High School, and Centralia High School. The school also offers professional and community education for adults. It is located just north of Rock Bridge High School in South Columbia.

References

External links
Official site

Schools in Columbia, Missouri
Vocational schools in the United States
Public high schools in Missouri